Joseph Peter "Joe Pete" Wilson (May 22, 1935 – September 13, 2019) was an American Olympic cross-country skier, who skied for the U.S. in cross-country at the 1960 Winter Olympics and later became a well-known skiing administrator in the United States. Wilson also in collaboration authored several books on cross-country skiing, all co-written by William J. Lederer. Wilson set up the cross-country ski area at the Trapp Family Lodge in Stowe, Vermont – the lodge established by the Trapp family of The Sound of Music fame. In 1973, Wilson organized a meeting of 25 ski areas and established the National Ski Touring Operators' Association. Wilson was named as its first President from 1973-1977. After several name changes it is now called the Cross Country Ski Areas Association (CCSAA). CCSAA is an international association of U.S. and Canadian cross-country ski areas. Wilson is also known for having set up an inn in Keene, New York, the Bark Eater Inn, and developing the ski trails around the inn.

Early life and education

Born in Lake Placid, New York to Gordon H. Wilson and Anna L. Wilson, Joe Pete spent his summers on his family farm in Keene, New York. In 1953 he graduated from Lake Placid High School where he was a Ski Meister Skier for four years. In 1954 he attended Vermont Academy under Warren Chivers. In 1958 he graduated from St. Lawrence University where he competed in cross country, Nordic combined, and Ski Meister under Otto Scheibs. He was used for team Alpine scoring only when necessary. He was elected Captain of the team for two years. As skiing started to grow in popularity in the U.S. in the 1940s and 1950s, colleges began including ski racing in their athletic programs. Since the sport was so new, college coaches had to use the four best skiers they had in order to qualify as a team. Each of the four did the best he could in his specialty of either cross country, jumping, downhill or slalom. A four event skier was the rare athlete that could place high in all four disciplines. Thus was born the Ski Meister Skier.

1963 Discovering Mount Van Hoevenberg

After leaving the U.S. Team, Wilson returned to Lake Placid and the family business. He volunteered coaching high school kids throughout the Adirondacks. He was eager to get coaches and skiers tuned into a great way of life.

He was also analyzing potential locations in the Lake Placid area to establish a U.S., Oslo style "Holmenkol". But the time was not right. He predicted at the time it would be at least ten years before there would be enough interest in the U.S. to support such an idea! Consequently, he was more than mildly surprised when he was contacted by the head of the New York State. Forest Rangers, Mr. William Petty, to research the Mount Van Hoevenberg area, with the idea in mind of creating cross country trails in a park type atmosphere. Since the bobsled run was already there, they had substantial land holdings there.

Wilson had developed a reputation in his late teens for his knowledge of the woods, his logging abilities, road building capabilities, and knowledge of heavy equipment. He eagerly took to the job. He spent two months tramping, judging, and recording his notes. His only concern at the time was if there would be adequate elevation change to comply with international rules. Subsequent land purchases solved that problem. As a result of the efforts required to hold the 1980 Olympics it became next to Holmenkollen, the premier cross country ski center in the world.

U.S. Army

From 1959 to 1963, Wilson was a lieutenant in the United States Army. He was assigned to the U.S. Biathlon Team Training at Fort Richardson, in Anchorage, Alaska. He spent his entire four-year service career competing in cross-country and in Biathlon for the U.S. in Europe and with the U.S. Army Marksmanship Team. 

Upon arrival at Fort Richardson, Wilson was shocked to discover there were absolutely no training facilities available for Biathlon. No trails, and most importantly, no shooting range. There were few people who knew what biathlon entailed. He convinced the U.S. Army Corps of Engineers to deliver a new caterpillar D-8. Wilson and his two teammates, Dick Taylor and Peter Lahdenpera, former college racing competitors, and the only three skiers representing the entire Nordic/biathlon team at the time, built a complex biathlon shooting range which was used for the next 12 years, until the U.S. Army stopped financing the U.S. Biathlon effort.

Olympic Pre-Trials
In 1959 Wilson placed first in the Olympic pre-trials in the 15k, also known as the North American Nordic championships-Squaw Valley. This placing set Joe Pete up as a major U.S. skier due to the number of U.S. and foreign competitors in the race. International Olympic Committee Rules require that a major International Competition be held in all events prior to an Olympic Competition, usually scheduled one year prior as a trial run to test the complex systems involved.

Nordic skiing is the poor cousin of Alpine (Downhill) skiing, which is so popular in the U.S.

The individual disciplines involved in the Nordics are cross-country ski racing, ski jumping, combined cross-country and jumping, biathlon- cross-country skiing, and rifle marksmanship!

1960 US Olympic Team

Wilson was a member of the U.S. Nordic Ski Team Competing in Squaw Valley, California in 1960. He skied the 30K. Finishing 43rd, the reverse of the number on his racing bib.  He later commented he somehow ended up with the wrong bib! Based on his results in the pre-Olympics, on the same courses in 1959, he should have placed much higher.

Racing in Europe

In 1961 and 1962, Wilson was on the U.S. Team racing in Europe, including Scandinavia, in cross-country and in biathlon. 
In 1962 he finished tenth in Falun, Sweden: in their National Championships among 900 competitors, a significant placing for an American at that time. Still impressive even today. This would be the equivalent to what is referred to today as a World Cup. His two teammates also had impressive performances. These placings remain the highest ever posted by a U.S. Skier to this day.

1964 North American Snowshoe Champion

Having just recently left the U.S. Ski Team, Wilson was ready for a little testing. The North American Snowshoe Championships sponsored by the Saranac Lake Chamber of Commerce as part of their famous Winter Carnival, which was first introduced in 1897, seemed to be the perfect place to test the water – in its fluffy form. Wilson was new to the sport, but not to competition. After the race he remarked that it certainly had been a pleasant day.

1965 Bronze Medalist in the Bobsled World Championship St. Moritz, Switzerland

Wilson came to the sport of bobsled wet behind the ears so to speak. It developed eventually that he possessed an innate love of ice. Once when asked what makes a good bobsledder he answered, "You have to love ice, and not just in your drinks". This fascination combined with his competitive spirit and drive made his work easy.

At one point he was the brakeman for the U.S. two man team and the #1 four man team in Europe. He somehow missed the 1964 Olympic Bobsled Team, where his former two ski team pals were competing in Insbruck, Austria, for the U.S. Ski Team. A fact he says that popped into his head from time to time that he regrets! Had fate played a different role Wilson could have been on three Olympic teams in three different sports. His national rankings in Polo and Auto Racing added to the mystique.

1967-1968 Treasurer Vermont Ski Areas Association

Wilson was elected treasurer of the Vermont Ski Areas Association.

During the formative years of Alpine skiing and the major growth of Big Alpine ski areas across the U.S., Vermont was the recognized leader in ski area development. Numerous innovations to ski area development, and the sport itself were pioneered in Vermont. It was in this environment that Wilson found himself from 1966 to 1969 as general manager of Burke Mountain, in East Burke, Vermont, just north of St. Johnsbury. Getting to know these people was fun, exciting, and highly educational, especially in the area of ski operation and management. Being elected treasurer of the ski areas association and controlling all that money wasn't bad either, but the opposite swing of the pendulum for Wilson.

Burke Mountain Academy

During the 1966 to 1969 period "Burke" was a small ski area in East Burke, Vermont. Under Wilson's management the facility was expanded, including the trails and base Lodge, where a bar and dining room were added. Several farmhouses were completely remodeled. Several condos, townhouses, and a vacation home were built. A complete sewage system was designed and built. Wilson staffed it with many young, enthusiastic people with skiing backgrounds, typical of the day. As a result of his real estate background, Wilson realized the future sales value of the land surrounding this Monadnock type mountain and the views it offered. Wilson also knew that along with ownership came the right to control the design and atmosphere of whatever was done in the future. Wilson put together a 4,000 acre land package on the north facing side, which also controlled lands on the east and west sides of the mountain.

In the continual effort to increase business at Burke, Wilson realized he had a lot of mountain and a lot of lift capacity, especially mid-week.  He was aware of the experiments with ski sports academies at Stratton and Stowe.  He decided it was worth a try. He made the proposal to his board and the Burke Mountain Academy was born.

1970 Complete Cross-Country Skiing and Ski Touring 

Co-authored "Complete Cross-Country Skiing and Ski Touring" with William J. Lederer. Many believe this book is responsible for starting the boom in cross-country skiing in the United States in the 1970s. To this day, Wilson does not know what initially brought Lederer to Burke. However, through a fairy tale series of events, a lasting friendship and a great book were the outcome. Many say this was typical of Wilson's career.

William J. Lederer was co-author with Eugene Burdick of one of the most well-known books in US history, "The Ugly American". Lederer was among the most prolific writers of the time. He had several other bestsellers. What did Lederer know about skiing, nothing, but Lederer knew how to write; Wilson knew how to ski, and could easily break down the principles of skiing techniques. They collaborated on the writing.

1971 Glen Ellen

He became director of advertising and public relations and manager of real estate sales at the Glen Ellen ski area in Vermont. Again, his love of skiing and knowledge of the sport combined with past work experiences aided him greatly. Most noteworthy was his ability to listen to and field questions. With his broad and extensive experiences he had plenty of resources to draw upon.

1971-72 Cooke City 

Barely noticeable, hidden in the very north western corner of Montana is a wide spot in the road called Cooke City.  Many people have passed through never realizing there is no charge for parking! It is only a few miles from the north east entrance to Yellowstone.

In 1971 & 1972 Wilson conducted an extensive Nordic summer ski camp here. With support from the well known ski sports writer John Hitchcock, Cooke City proved to be an ideal location. The mountains in this area provide one exciting view after another. The skiing occurred at 11,000" to 13,000". The days were divided between short, scenic tours with substantial instruction and distance tours to the famous Grasshopper Glacier, where on hot summer days the glacier relaxed its hold on thousands of grasshoppers.  Initially, millions had eaten the ground bare in the mid-west but had been driven off the plains in a violent windstorm, then caught in a freak Fall snowstorm here in the bitterroots. With endless sunny days and snow everywhere the days offered up rare experiences.

1972 Trapp Family Lodge
Wilson set up the cross-country ski operation at the Trapp Family Lodge in Stowe, Vermont. Recognized as the first commercial cross country ski area in the U.S.  Summing up all his experiences to that point, his alpine ski shop experiences as a kid in Lake Placid, traveling and racing in Europe and Scandinavia, writing the cross country ski book, counseling ski and hiking clubs planning ski treks, Wilson put together a cohesive plan for this new operation.  He had a feeling even then that this could become a showcase.  But he was plowing new ground.  There were no examples to follow.  There were no cross-country ski centers in operation in the U.S. or Canada at that time. This would be a first. It would be an experiment! For Wilson, there was a lot riding on it.  This format became the standard for cross-country operations across the United States for years to come. The Trapp Family Lodge Ski Center operates much the same today as when Joe Pete originally set it up.

To Whom it May Concern:

It is a privilege to put forth a personal recommendation for my distinguished friend and colleague Joe Pete Wilson, who has been an esteemed business associate for nearly three decades.

Joe Pete's history within the sport of Nordic skiing is unparalleled. In 1960 he skied in the Squaw Valley Olympic Games and has stuck with the love of skiing ever since. In 1972 he directed the first commercial cross country ski area in North America (Trapp Family Lodge). Within a year he founded the industry alliance of xc ski area operators, which is now referred to as the Cross Country Ski Areas Association. There are over 300 members throughout the United States and Canada. He has written several promotional books on the subject and has even operated his own inn and ski area.

With creativity, collaboration and tenacity he has helped to fuel several promotions of the sport. His sense of humor and dedicated spirit also contribute in making him a true coalition builder.

I am proud to call Joe Pete a friend.

Sincerely, 
Charlie Yerrick
(Nordic Director, Trapp Family Lodge, Retired)

1972 CCSAA

Wilson could see that cross-country skiing was coming on. He realized there was little knowledge or information available to the general public in the United States about cross-country skiing. He decided an organization of area operators could exchange ideas, disseminate information, set standards, and assist insurance companies in the area of risk management. After a successful start and a couple of name changes, a strong and effective national organization emerged called the Cross-Country Ski Area Association (CCSAA) which is now an international organization including Canada and is headquartered in Winchester, New Hampshire.

1973 North American Nordic

He established a company called North American Nordic (N.A.N). He picked fifteen of the best locations in the Northeastern United States, that he could find, that he thought would make good cross-country ski operations. It was a combination of golf courses in urban areas and Country Inns in mountainous locations covering seven states. He groomed trails in all locations. This was a first for cross-country ski areas. The concept of a franchise type operation and the grooming of trails were a radical step in the right direction for cross-country skiing at the time. It ceased operations upon the death of his friend John Greene, also an elite skier who was from Auburn, Maine.

1974 P.S.I.A.

At a point Wilson realized a cohesive teaching system for cross-country was imperative. He brought together a small group of people working in the sport who were involved with major cross-country ski areas. A solid teaching system evolved, which was universally accepted and known today as P.S.I.A. Wilson was honored by a lifetime achievement membership in P.S.I.A. He is now serving in his fortieth year.

Joe Pete Wilson-

Few individuals deserve more credit for the revival of the sport and industry of cross country skiing than Joe Pete Wilson. I have known Joe Pete for more than four decades. He always loomed larger than life in my eyes. I first encountered Joe Pete in the early 1970s when I was a fledgling cross country ski instructor. I saw a movie in which Joe Pete was the skier and I was amazed at his technique. I was an instructor at one of his franchised North America Nordic centers- Blackberry River Inn, CT. One of my early experiences with Joe Pete included a spring trip to Jackson, NH to attend a meeting of EPSTI instructors. All the instructors decided to take on the Wildcat Valley Trail, a challenging hunk of terrain especially under snow conditions that day. I was having a tough time of it and Joe Pete kept with me and offered continuous encouragement.

Joe Pete was a visionary for the cross country ski sport. He was one of the original "Eastern Professional Ski Touring Instructors" (EPSTI) and owner/operator of the Bark Eater Lodge. His missionary work in promoting the sport through instruction and the development of an organized industry association for Nordic areas was tireless. Early efforts to organize the EPSTI and codify instruction techniques, lesson plans and promotion evolved into NESTOA (North East Ski Touring Operators Association) which we worked hard to morph into a national organization NSTOA (National Ski Touring Operators Association) which eventually gathered international members and became CCSAA (Cross Country Ski Areas Association).

I still stand in awe at his vision and accomplishments.

1975 Scandinavia

The man called "The Father of Nordic Skiing in the US", in his area of expertise at the time, Leonard "Butch" Widen says the idea to import a US Nordic businessman to Scandinavia to lecture on the Nordic scene in the US originated in Scandinavia. Wilson was chosen for the job. He spent three weeks lecturing in Norway, Sweden, and Finland. His secondary assignment was to test aquavite. Wilson was up for the task. He was familiar with the customs and the people in all three of the countries due to his racing experiences. His knowledge, wit, sensitivities, and patience aided him greatly. The experiment was a success.

1977-1978 United States Biathlon Team

Wilson was named coach of the US Biathlon team. Wilson was recommended for the job based on his racing career and his extensive coaching experience. His resume included his highly successful book plus his guidance in producing the PSIA instructors manual. His knowledge of Kentucky windage and his extensive training in rifle marksmanship by the famous M.Sgt Marvin Fitzpatrick of the U.S. army rifle team also helped. In 1978-79, the US Biathlon Team had significant success at the World Championships held in Lake Placid prior to the 1980 Olympics. Among other things, he was given a signed poster for his efforts, with the inscription 'Your incomparable enthusiasm continues'.

1979-1980 Olympic Venue Manager

Wilson was the venue manager for the bobsled and Luge events at the 1980 Lake Placid Olympics. He directed a staff of 4,000 employees and volunteers.

1981 Bark Eater
Wilson took control of the family inn business known as the Bark Eater in Keene, New York. Bark Eater is the English translation of the Indian word Adirondack. Due to business regulations at the time the Bark Eater Inn and Silver Saddle Riding Stable operated as DBA's, under Indian Meadows Farms, the corporate name. Wilson built a polo field, an ingenious trick on an Adirondack hillside farm. The riding stable grew to a total of eighty-five horses.

1981 Bark Eater X-C Trail System

Utilizing old cow paths and logging trails, and the rolling terrain and hills nearby on the 250 acres he owned, Wilson designed and personally constructed a trail system that people drove for miles to try. From growing up in the earth-moving and logging business as a child, he was a skilled heavy equipment operator. The key Wilson says, is to not be too heavy. "When it comes to uphill and downhill, you can't fool an old dairy cow!" The trail system had several rest stops and overlooks. There were no challenging ascents nor precipitous descents preventing anyone's access.

1983 World Masters

He was chosen as the Chief of Race for the World Masters skiing competition at Mount Van Hoevenberg in Lake Placid. This event attracted 1000 competitors. An overwhelming number at that time. This time Lake Placid had snow and many experienced volunteers.

1984 Nordic Alliance

Nordic Skiing hit a major slump. There was major concern and no clear cut answers. Wilson got some of his merry band together to try to get answers. There were some positive results. The major problems were defined, thus directing all future energy in the right direction. More time would have made a significant impact on the sport. Wilson had been carrying the administrative and financial duties but was finally forced to direct all his energies and resources to his business.

1985 Country Inns and Back Roads

The Bark Eater Inn was invited to join "country inns and back roads", considered by many as a list of the top 200 country inns in the United States.

1986 Ski Magazine

A story in "Ski Magazine" called Wilson "an iconoclast before his time."

1986 Ski Inns Book "Cross-Country Ski Inns of the Northeastern United States and Canada"

Based on the idea of a simple concept. Wilson was asked to put together a unique coffee-table book combining country inns and cross-country ski centers, often referred to as the "Ski Inns Book". He put together a financial plan, contacted the ski inns, and personally visited each to check qualifications and facilities. The result was a successful, classy coffee-table book.

1991 Second Ski Inns Book "Cross-Country Ski Inns of the Northeastern US and Quebec"

The success and sales of the first ski inns book led to the publication of a second, referred to as the second edition which included some minor changes and some new inns. It too was popular and in fact today there are no books left of either publication. For a time Wilson had one copy of each edition, but now there is question if there are any, except in private collections.

2000 Ski Trax Magazine

Wilson was named one of the top ten people who have done the most to promote the growth of cross-country skiing in the United States in the last century.

2001 Lake Placid Hall of Fame

Wilson was inducted into the Lake Placid Hall of Fame.

2011 St. Lawrence Hall of Fame

Wilson was inducted into the St. Lawrence University Hall of Fame.

2013 The Nordic Concept

Many people are unsure of the meaning of the various terms used in skiing. When the term Alpine is used, some people are immediately aware of the different disciplines that the term signifies. This is not the case with the term Nordic. Also, now the Nordic discipline of biathlon is becoming popular, adding more confusion. After considerable thought, Wilson has decided what is really needed is a universal symbol - a trademark representative of or depicting all four disciplines (Cross Country, Jumping, Combined, Biathlon). In this respect, there are a myriad of hurdles to consider. But progress is being made.

There are numerous ways to encourage greater use of the word Nordic. One simple way is to create a patch depicting the Nordic disciplines or a Nordic setting. One design for a distinctive patch has been completed and is part way through production. Other ideas such as pins, etc. are being explored. Production designs on those will start right away. Wilson has also launched a grassroots campaign to use the term "Nordic" more in conversation, writing, in print and signage.

2014 The New Ski

Although snowshoeing is a great recreational sport, many people find the snowshoe a difficult, frustrating challenge. Many attempts, some with great research and monetary expense have been made to develop a better design. Wilson has designed what he calls a snowshoe that slides. It has a slight side cut. The tip is slightly wider than the midpoint and the tail is slightly more narrow than the tip, but still wider than the midpoint. It functions best when used with a three pin OB binding and a rugged boot, like the Fisher OB3. It has a no wax base and a slight reverse camber (rocker). He has designed a second ski, a skate/touring concept and is working on its development and production.

2014 Founders Award

Wilson was honored with a Founders Award by Chris Frado, Executive Director and President of CCSAA for his work and dedication to the sport of cross-country skiing and the CCSAA.

2015

Rumors of Lake Placid making a bid for a future Olympics have begun to circulate. Wilson is combining his knowledge of the area and his past Olympic experiences to draft a cohesive, workable plan the Lake Placid area can submit that will adequately utilize everything Lake Placid and the surrounding area have to offer and to enhance the chances of being awarded the bid! With only slight changes to traditional procedures a solid plan can be developed. As always, there will be naysayers and reluctance on the part of some to cooperate. However, Wilson's philosophy is that time and thought solve all problems. Wilson feels In order to make a successful bid for the next Winter Olympics, the U.S. will have to join forces with Canada. This will open up access and more potential venues, and ease financial burdens for only one country.

Personal life

Joe Pete Wilson resided outside Lake Placid, NY; near the Saranac Lake area, home to 3 new Nordic Olympians, one winning Gold.

Results

Biography

This summary was assembled primarily from newspaper and magazine articles written through the years, factual notes, wild stories, and interviews.

Selected works
 "Complete Cross-Country Skiing and Ski Touring", 1970 (co-author)

References

1935 births
2019 deaths
American male bobsledders
American male cross-country skiers
Cross-country skiers at the 1960 Winter Olympics
Olympic cross-country skiers of the United States
People from Keene, New York
People from Lake Placid, New York
Sportspeople from New York (state)
St. Lawrence University alumni
United States Army officers
Vermont Academy alumni